Nate Barlow (born Nathanael Jackson Barlow on July 6, 1975) is an American film director, actor, screenwriter and producer. Born in Middletown, Connecticut, to two musicians and teaching parents, he spent two years as a child in Tanzania, where he attended the International School Moshi. He graduated with a Bachelor of Science in Electrical & Computer Engineering from Carnegie Mellon University in 1996, after which he worked as a designer engineer for Symbol Technologies on Long Island before moving to Los Angeles to pursue his filmmaking career.

Barlow wrote the Meghan Markle-starrer Random Encounters, a romantic-comedy directed by Boris Undorf and initially distributed by Gravitas Ventures.  Random Encounters was rereleased in the UK as A Random Encounter, on May 7, 2018. Barlow also co-directed, co-wrote and co-starred in Tales from Beyond, an anthology feature film starring Adam West that won Best Picture Awards at the 2004 ShockerFest International Film Festival and 2004 Shriekfest Film Festivals before being distributed by Anthem Pictures.

Barlow has also worked in documentaries, co-producing The Water of Life, about the craft of scotch whisky, and directing the experimental animated documentary short A Brief History of Hollywood, which intertwines the history of the Hollywood Sign with the history of Hollywood technology. A Brief History of Hollywood has played numerous festivals, including Dances With Films, St. Louis International Film Festival, Hot Springs Documentary Film Festival, Sonoma International Film Festival, and San Francisco Frozen Film Festival. Film Threat described A Brief History of Hollywood as "fantastic" and as "irresistible nostalgia porn," rating the film 8/10. Early in his career, Barlow directed the interview-based documentary short Film Trix 2002 and produced the narrative feature film Hollywood, Pennsylvania, which had a live making-of documentary broadcast from the set onto the World Wide Web.

Barlow's acting work includes L.A. Twister, the lowest-budgeted film ever to premiere at Grauman's Chinese Theatre, and Chance, the directorial debut of Amber Benson, as well as commercials.

Barlow currently lives in Los Angeles.

Filmography

Actor
 Random Encounters (2010)
 Tales from Beyond (2004)
 L.A. Twister (2004)
 Chance (2002)
 Hollywood, Pennsylvania (2001)
 Yup Yup Man (aka Dark Justice) (2000)
 Killing The Vision (1999)
 Take It Easy (1999)

Director
 A Brief History of Hollywood (2020)
 Tales from Beyond (2004)
 Film Trix 2002 (2002)

Screenwriter
 A Brief History of Hollywood (2020)
 Random Encounters (2010)
 Tales from Beyond (2004)

Producer
 The Water of Life (2021)
 A Brief History of Hollywood (2020)
 Tales from Beyond (2004)
 Chance (associate producer) (2002)
 Film Trix 2002 (2002)
 Hollywood, Pennsylvania (2001)
 Take It Easy (1999)

Notes

External links

The Official Website of Nate Barlow
The Official Website of Tales From Beyond
The Official Website of Hollywood, Pennsylvania

American male film actors
American film directors
American film producers
American male screenwriters
Male actors from Connecticut
1975 births
Living people